Lot 35 is a township in Queens County, Prince Edward Island, Canada.  It is part of Bedford Parish. Lot 35 was awarded to Sir Alexander Maitland, 1st Baronet in the 1767 land lottery. It was sold in 1792 to John MacDonald of Glenaladale.

References

35
Geography of Queens County, Prince Edward Island